The epicenter, or  epicentre, is the point on the Earth's surface that is directly above the point where an earthquake or underground explosion originates.

Epicenter or epicentre may also refer to:

 Blast seat, the point of detonation of an explosive device
 Epicenter (book), a 2006 book by Joel C. Rosenberg
 Epicenter (music festival), an annual rock festival in North Carolina, USA
 Epicenter (sculpture), a work by Ernest Carl Shaw in Milwaukee, Wisconsin, US
 Epicentr K, a network of home improvement retail stores in Ukraine
 LoanMart Field, previously the Rancho Cucamonga Epicenter, a baseball stadium in California
 Epicentre, a research component of Doctors Without Borders - see 
 Epicenter (horse), an American thoroughbred race horse